Gunyidi is a small town in the Shire of Coorow. The town is situated between Moora and Carnamah in the Mid West region of Western Australia.

The town was originally a siding along the Midlands Railway and was initially known as Siberia Fettlers Camp, which was established in 1906. The name was soon changed to Gunnyidi. It was declared as a town in 1930 and the name was officially changed to the present spelling in 1973.

The name is Aboriginal in origin and is a shortened name for a nearby well Mungerdegunyidie.

References

Towns in Western Australia
Shire of Coorow